Alan Douglas (born 16 October 1951, in Dundee) is a journalist and broadcaster.

Douglas was a reporter and then studio presenter on BBC Scotland's evening news programme Reporting Scotland from 1978 to 1996.

Alan Douglas left Reporting Scotland in 1996 having already teamed up with his wife Viv Lumsden to co-present Scottish Television's BAFTA-winning style programme, The Home Show for six years.

He has worked on newspapers and radio throughout his journalistic career which has spanned over forty years, starting at the Comet Newspaper, Hitchin, Hertfordshire. He spent four years working in BBC Local Radio in Cumbria and Humberside before returning to BBC Scotland.

Douglas is a former founding director of The Broadcasting Business Ltd, a media consultancy specialising in media awareness and presentation skills training and crisis management. 

Douglas still writes extensively about driving and cars as a freelance motoring correspondent, contributing to websites, newspapers and BBC Radio and TV Scotland and Scottish Television on motoring and transport issues.

He is a member of the Institute of Advanced Motorists and holds a car, bus, lorry and motorbike licence and is a former Regional Journalist of the Year of the Guild of Motoring Writers. After many years living in Glasgow he has gone back to his roots and lives in a hillside cottage in an Angus Glen. Douglas has one sister, two adult daughters, two step children and eight grandchildren.

Sources

Who's Who In Scotland 2003 edition (Carrick Media, Kilmarnock) 

1951 births
BBC Scotland newsreaders and journalists
Living people
Journalists from Dundee